Henry Dana Ward (1797 in Shrewsbury, Massachusetts – 1884) was an American abolitionist, anti-Masonic campaigner, and Millerite Adventist. He was grandson of the Revolutionary general Artemas Ward. He graduated from Harvard.

Works
 Free Masonry: Its Pretensions Exposed in Faithful Extracts of Its Standard Authors. 1828
 Glad tidings : for the kingdom of heaven is at hand. 1838
 The gospel of the Kingdom; a Kingdom not of this world; not in this world; but to come in the heavenly country, of the resurrection from the dead and of the restitution of all things 1870
 History of the cross: the pagan origin, and idolatrous adoption and worship, of the image. 1871

References

1797 births
1884 deaths
American abolitionists
Harvard University alumni
Millerites